The 2006–07 Phoenix Suns season started with the team trying to return to the Western Conference Finals, where they were eliminated in six games by the Dallas Mavericks in the previous season, 2005–06. After an excellent regular season in which they posted a 61–21 record, in a rematch of last season's first round where they came back from a 3–1 deficit, they defeated the Los Angeles Lakers in the opening round of the playoffs in five games, but were narrowly defeated in the Western Conference Semifinals in six games by the more experienced and heavily favored and eventual NBA champion San Antonio Spurs. The Suns had the best team offensive rating in the NBA.

The Suns' marketing slogan for the 2006–07 season was Eyes on the Prize. Billboards and bus wraps showed closeups of the eyes of a different Suns player, each face photographed in a strongly tinted purple color (orange on some ads), with small reflections of the NBA championship trophy reflected in the pupils.

This was the last season the Suns won their division until the 2020–21 season.

Offseason
 Ann Meyers-Drysdale was hired as a vice-president for the Suns.

NBA Draft

Roster

† – Minimum 20 field goals made.
^ – Minimum 10 free throws made.

References

Phoenix Suns seasons